Gemeliers is a Spanish music group who have achieved four number-one albums in Spain, with their most recent being the album Stereo on 28 June 2018. They were also nominated for "Favorite Italian Singer" in the 2017 Kids' Choice Awards.

Discography

Albums

References

Spanish musical duos